Formula Rossa (Arabic: فورمولا روسا) is a launched roller coaster located at Ferrari World in Abu Dhabi, United Arab Emirates.

Ride description 
Formula Rossa surpassed Kingda Ka at Six Flags Great Adventure as the world's fastest roller coaster when it opened in 2010, although Kingda Ka retained its record of tallest in the world. Riders experience up to 1.7 g-force during acceleration and up to 4.8 g throughout the ride. Its shape was inspired by the legendary Italian racetrack Autodromo Nazionale di Monza. Riders are required to wear safety goggles to protect from airborne particles such as dust.

References

External links

 

 

Roller coasters in the United Arab Emirates
Roller coasters introduced in 2010
Ferrari World Abu Dhabi
2010 establishments in the United Arab Emirates